Humphry Douglas Francis Hatton (born 1962), is a male former CEO of Deloitte's Corporate Finance businesses in the Middle East and a former rower who competed for Great Britain and England.

Rowing career
Hatton represented Great Britain in the 1986 World Championships. He represented England and won a bronze medal in the coxless four, at the 1986 Commonwealth Games in Edinburgh, Scotland.

References

1962 births
English male rowers
Commonwealth Games medallists in rowing
Commonwealth Games bronze medallists for England
Rowers at the 1986 Commonwealth Games
Sportspeople from Oxford
Living people
Medallists at the 1986 Commonwealth Games